The WAGR ADH class was a four member class of diesel railcars operated by the Western Australian Government Railways.

History
As part of an order for 18 ADG class railcars for Perth suburban services, an additional four were ordered from Cravens, Sheffield with different interiors for county work with the first three delivered in June 1955 and the fourth in 1956. When demand warranted, they operated with an ACL compartment car as a trailer.

They operated services from Perth to Miling, Wyalkatchem and Bunbury and from Geraldton to Cue.

Following the withdrawal of the services they operated, they were transferred to Perth to operate alongside the ADGs. They were refitted with similar interiors to the ADGs in 1962/63. In the mid-1980s, all were repowered with Mercedes-Benz engines.

References

Diesel multiple units of Western Australia